Mervyn Oscar Bessen (29 August 1913 – 13 July 2002) was an Australian sportsman who played both Australian rules football and cricket at high levels.

Bessen was born in Tambellup, Western Australia, a small town in the state's Great Southern region. He attended Albany High School. Bessen was recruited to the Subiaco Football Club for the 1937 WANFL season, and played twelve games after making his debut in round two. He kicked 18 goals, including six in one game against , but did not return to the WANFL the following season. A left-handed middle-order batsman, Bessen played his sole match of first-class cricket in March 1938, appearing for Western Australia against an Australian XI on its way to a tour of England. In the match, played at the WACA Ground, he scored 39 runs in the first innings and one run in the second, with his team suffering a heavy defeat.

References

External links
WAFL Football statistics

1913 births
2002 deaths
Australian cricketers
Australian rules footballers from Western Australia
Cricketers from Western Australia
People from Tambellup, Western Australia
Subiaco Football Club players
Western Australia cricketers